Mulka is an electoral division of the Northern Territory Legislative Assembly in Australia. It was created in a 2019 redistribution for the 2020 general election, replacing the electoral division of Nhulunbuy. At that election, independent Nhulunbuy incumbent Yingiya Mark Guyula won the seat in a tightly contested rematch of the 2016 general election.

Members for Mulka

Election results

References

External links
Division Profile: Division of Mulka

Electoral divisions of the Northern Territory
2020 establishments in Australia
Constituencies established in 2020